Pacific Ridge School, referred to as Pacific Ridge or PRS, is an independent co-educational college preparatory school for students in grades 6–12. The private middle and high school is located in the Bressi Ranch community of Carlsbad, a coastal resort town located in North San Diego County, California. The school educates 685 students enrolled during the 2022–2023 school year. Pacific Ridge's main academic and athletic rivals are The Bishop's School located in La Jolla, La Jolla Country Day School located in University City and Francis Parker School in Linda Vista.

History and leadership
In the fall of 2002, several families began thinking about the prospect for an independent middle and high school in North County San Diego, California. They crafted a mission statement to guide the development and operation of the school, formed a founding Board of Trustees, and purchased land in south Carlsbad for the campus. The school opened in 2007.

Dr. Eileen Mullady, an educator with an extensive background in secondary and higher education, came to Pacific Ridge School from Horace Mann School in New York. She took up the position of founding Head of School in the summer of 2005.

Current Head of School, Dr. Bob Ogle, joined the founding staff in 2006 and assisted Dr. Mullady and the Board of Trustees implement the vision for Pacific Ridge School, as well as its construction and programs. He became Co-Head of School in July 2011 and succeeded Dr. Mullady upon her retirement in April 2013.

Dr. Ogle holds an Ed.D. and an M.Ed. in Educational Leadership and an M.A. in English Education from Teachers College, Columbia University and B.A degrees in English and Economics from the University of California, Davis.

Pacific Ridge welcomed its founding seventh- and ninth-grade students in the fall of 2007. Additional grades were subsequently added and the first graduating class was in 2011.

Academics

Harkness Learning 

Pacific Ridge School is Harkness Learning. Instead of sitting at rows of desks facing a blackboard, classes of 15 students sit with their teacher around a large, oval table, called a Harkness table. Because of this arrangement, the exchange of information during a lesson differs from that in a traditional classroom. Students listen, ask questions, and learn from the teacher and from each other.

The school maintains a student-to-faculty ratio of 7:1.

Pacific Ridge School's curriculum and graduation requirements exceed those of the State of California diploma and UC/CSU eligibility.

Global Education 
Global issues are woven throughout the curriculum and the final weeks of the school year are reserved for student trips. Roughly 90% of students participate in global travel at Pacific Ridge School.

6th and 7th graders explore nature and small communities in Big Bear and Catalina Island;
8th graders consider notions of civic action and national government in Washington, D.C.

Students in 9th and 10th grade gain important independence and experience traveling
internationally and exploring wilderness environments in the U.S.

Eleventh and twelfth-grade students can choose from a number of school-designed trips to destinations around the globe or can plan their own individual travel experience. In 2019, students traveled to South Africa, the Galapagos Islands, Colombia, Vietnam, Kenya, Italy, Iceland, Austin, TX, Vienna and Prague.

Since the school's founding, students have traveled throughout 58 countries on six continents.

Service Learning 
As part of the Carlsbad private school's standard curriculum, students in every grade level put ethics into practice, locally and globally, in a year-long Service Learning program. Students meet during a weekly class period to gain academic, teamwork, leadership and problem-solving skills to apply in real-world situations.

Campus

The 14.5-acre campus consists of a middle school, high school, arts and technology center, innovation center & library, athletic center and artificial turf field.

The 27,750-square-foot Middle School and Administration building was built in 2015 and encompasses 11 seminar classrooms, three science labs, a lab prep room and administrative offices. A Middle School Reading room opens to an outdoor courtyard where students can gather to socialize and collaborate. Teacher workrooms overlook the reading room to promote interaction amoung faculty and students.

The 32,500-square-foot high school building was designed with environmental sustainability in mind. Features of the building include 19 seminar-style classrooms, four chemistry, biology and physics laboratories, four teacher workrooms and two double-story reading rooms. An outdoor town square provides space for student gatherings, dining and events.

The Arts & Technology Center, built in 2015, includes studios for theater, dance and 2D and 3D art, music practice rooms and exhibition galleries. The Technology Design Center supports digital technology such as film/audio production, graphic design and computer programming as well as a Design & Fabrication studio for robotics work and theater set construction.

The Innovation Center & Library, completed in 2021, houses the library, a robotics/maker space, an advanced biotech lab, an electronics and technology lab, the Student Support Center, and several classrooms.

Pacific Ridge School's 35,265-square-foot athletic facility is one of the largest among San Diego private schools. The school also has a regulation-size artificial turf soccer and lacrosse field for hosting interscholastic competitions and physical education classes.

Admissions
The admission process consists of a campus tour, submitting an application, scheduling an interview for both parents and students, taking the Independent School Entrance Exam (ISEE) and submitting academic records and teacher recommendations. Tuition for the 2022–2023 academic year is $36,950. The school provides over $3.5 million in tuition assistance and 31 percent of students receive aid.

Faculty 
Members of Pacific Ridge's faculty have diverse backgrounds and have studied at top institutions across the country and around the world. Currently, they come from 23 different states and nine different countries. Teachers are organized into academic departments as well as grade-level, collaborative teams that meet twice a week.

The school employs 85 faculty members, 70% of whom hold advanced degrees.

College acceptances 
Graduates from Pacific Ridge School have been accepted to top colleges and universities in all regions of the United States as well as several countries abroad. The school's college matriculations web page provides a comprehensive list.

The diploma requirements are as follows:

·      English – 4 consecutive years

·      History-Social Studies – 3 years

·      Science – 3 years

·      Mathematics – 3 years

·      Foreign Language – 3 years of same language

·      Visual or Performing Arts – 2 years

·      Service Learning – 2 years

·      Health – 1 trimester

·      Athletics/Physical Education – 2 years (or equivalent)

Athletics 
Middle and high school students have the option to participate in team sports at multiple levels during the fall, winter and spring.

Pacific Ridge School is a member of the California Interscholastic Federation San Diego Section and competes in the Coastal Conference.

Middle school teams compete in the South Coast Middle School League and offer a “no cut” participation policy, so that all students have the opportunity to play team sports and try a sport with which they may not already be familiar.

The athletic program includes several highly competitive teams, such as the Pacific Ridge Hockey Club, champion of the 2019 Anaheim Ducks High School Hockey League in 2019 and finalist in the CAHA Division 2 State tournament.

Visual and performing arts 
All seventh and eighth graders participate in a year-long Middle School Arts Program that explores art forms including dance, digital media arts, theater, studio art and music. Student performances are part of the Middle School arts curriculum and take place throughout the year.

Upper School students have the option of taking year-long classes in the arts. More than 30 classes are offered.

Student life

Activities and clubs 
A variety of activities and clubs are offered at the San Diego private school, most of which are built into the school day, A full list is available online.

Some of the Upper School extracurricular activities include Astronomy Club, Digital Arts Club, Finance & Investment, Gardening Club, Improv Theater, Robotics, School Newspaper and Student Council. Some of the Middle School options are Skateboarding Club, Dance Club, Underwater Robotics, Rock Band, Wood Shop and Yoga.

Academic competition clubs 
Model United Nations:

The award-winning Pacific Ridge School team participates in several regional and national MUN competitions each year, and hosts the annual North Coast Regional Conference in partnership with High Tech High North County.

Academic League:

Pacific Ridge School participates in the North Division of the North County Academic League, competing against Mission Vista High School, Rancho Buena Vista High School, Vista High School, Guajome Park Academy, Oceanside High School and El Camino High School.

Science Olympiad:

Pacific Ridge School competes in the San Diego Regional Science Olympiad in Divisions B and C.

Robotics:

Pacific Ridge School hosts both Middle School and Upper School Robotics teams and competes in SeaPerch Underwater Robotics and FIRST Tech Challenge. Both teams have progressed to regional and national competitions.

Student publications 
Global Vantage, a student-run publication and service learning group collaborates with students from Kibera Girls Soccer Academy in Kibera, Kenya and Canyon Crest Academy in San Diego. The print and online magazine collects and edits stories from authors around the world, and has won numerous national awards. These include the Edmund J. Sullivan Award (2014), Gold Crown Award (2014, 2012) from the Columbia Scholastic Press Association and the U.S. Department of Education's 2012 National Education Startup Challenge.

The Element is a student publication featuring digital media arts, studio arts and poetry.

Ridge Report is a weekly online student newspaper.

School publications 
The school publishes its magazine, "The VIEW" twice yearly, as well as weekly e-newsletters to the school community.

Identity work 
Students work extremely hard to create an inclusive environment surrounding identity through student-run affinity and alliance groups. These groups meet in order to share culture, experiences, food, art, or some combination of all of these. This creates a sense of community and a safe space for students with marginalized identities. Affinity and alliance groups are constantly being created on campus:

American Asian Pacific Islander, Anti-Racist Group, Black Student Union, Feminists United, Gender Sexuality Alliance, Jewish Affinity Group, Latinx Unidos, Middle Eastern North African, Multicultural Alliance, South Asian Alliance

See also 

 List of primary and secondary schools in San Diego

Footnotes 

Educational institutions established in 2007
High schools in San Diego County, California
Private high schools in California
Private middle schools in California
Carlsbad, California
Preparatory schools in California
2007 establishments in California